The 2023 FIVB Volleyball Boys' U19 World Championship will be the 18th edition of the FIVB Volleyball Boys' U19 World Championship, the biennial international youth volleyball championship contested by the men's national teams under the age of 19 of the members associations of the Fédération Internationale de Volleyball (FIVB), the sport's global governing body. It will be held in Argentina from 4 to 13 August 2023.

Athletes must born on or after 1 January 2005.

Poland are the defending champions.

Host selection
On 2 June 2022, FIVB opened the bidding process for member associations whose countries were interested in hosting one of the four Age Group World Championships in 2023 (i.e., U19 Boys' and Girls' World Championships and U21 Men's and Women's World Championships). The expression of interest of the member associations had to be submitted to FIVB by 29 July 2022, 18:00 CEST (UTC+2).

FIVB announced the hosts for its four Age Group World Championship on 24 January 2023, with Argentina being selected to host the 2023 Boys' U19 World Championship. Previously, Argentina had been announced as host country by the Argentine Volleyball Federation on 20 December 2022. This will be the third time that Argentina hosts the FIVB Boys' U19 World Championship having previously done so in 2011 and 2015.

Qualification
A total of 20 national teams qualified for the final tournament. In addition to Argentina who qualified automatically as hosts, the other 19 teams qualified through five separate continental competitions which had to be completed by 31 December 2022 at the latest.

The slot allocation was setted as follow:
AVC (Asia & Oceania): 4
CAVB (Africa): 2
CEV (Europe): 6
CSV (South America): 3
NORCECA (North, Central America and Caribbean): 4
Host: 1

See also
2023 FIVB Volleyball Girls' U19 World Championship

References

External links
Basic Conditions for organising Junior & Youth World Championships

FIVB Volleyball Boys' U19 World Championship
World Championship U19